The GMD GMDH-3 was an experimental diesel-hydraulic switching locomotive built in January 1960 by General Motors Diesel of Canada.  Only one example was built, with GMD serial number A1813.
The locomotive was essentially the GMDH-1 design but with only a single hood, a single engine and an end cab, mounted on a six-wheel chassis.

History
After being built in January 1960, the locomotive served as a demonstrator for GMD, bearing number #275, between 1960 and 1962, during which it spent a period in Egypt, but no sales resulted. The locomotive was sold in 1963 to McKinnon Industries of St. Catharines, Ontario as their plant switcher, #2128. After nearly 30 years of service, it was sold in 1992 to the South Simcoe Railway, a heritage museum railway, in Tottenham, Ontario, but in 1995 it was declared surplus to requirements by the railway's directors.  

After a fund-raising effort, the Southern Michigan Railroad Society purchased the locomotive in 1996, where it remains in operable condition .  
As of June 2015, GMDH-3 had been repainted in two-tone blue, and is still parked in Clinton, Michigan awaiting funds for restoration.

See also 
List of GMD Locomotives
GMD GMDH-1

References

GMDH-3
Experimental locomotives
C locomotives
Railway locomotives introduced in 1960
Preserved diesel locomotives
Diesel locomotives of Canada
Standard gauge locomotives of Canada
Diesel-hydraulic locomotives